Mountain Tracks: Volume 3 is a progressive bluegrass live album by the Yonder Mountain String Band; it is part of the live series Mountain Tracks. It was released on September 14, 2004 by SCI Fidelity.

The album occupies two discs. The first disc carries the band's performance on September 12; the second carries the concert performed on September 13. The concert features a guest appearance by fiddler Darol Anger. The song "Ring of Fire" by Johnny Cash is a hidden song at the end of the first disc  and was performed when news was received of the deaths of Johnny Cash and actor John Ritter earlier in the day.

Track listing

Disc one 

 "Bloody Mary Morning" (Willie Nelson) – 3:14
 "Coo Coo's Nest" (w/ Jeff Austin & Adam Aijala) (John Hartford) – 3:23
 "Town" (Ben Kaufmann) – 2:27
 "If There's Still Ramblin' in the Rambler (Let Him Go)" (Jeff Austin) – 3:42
 "Steep Grade, Sharp Curves / Ramblin' Reprise" (Austin) – 7:05
 "Traffic Jam" (Kaufmann) – 10:28
 "Years With Rose" (Benny Galloway) – 7:16
 "Winds O' Wyoming" (Galloway) – 4:17
 "Traffic Jam" (Kaufmann) – 4:36
 "Holding" (Hartford) – 8:57

Disc two 

 "Queen of the Earth" (Traditional) – 3:21
 "Train Bound for Glory Land" (Galloway) – 3:55
 "Little Rabbit" (Traditional) – 7:46
 "Left Me in a Hole" (Adam Aijala) – 5:40
 "Old Plank Road" (w/ Sally Truitt) (Traditional) – 3:01
 "Deep Pockets" (Galloway, Dave Johnston) – 3:54
 "Maid of the Canyon" (Johnston) – 3:59
 "Too Late Now" (Austin) – 6:19
 "Yee Haw Factor" (w/Pastor Tim) (Yonder Mountain String Band) – 0:45
 "Kentucky Mandolin" (Bill Monroe) – 8:53
 "Peace of Mind" (Austin) – 5:30
 "Snow on the Pines" (Austin) – 8:37
 "Peace of Mind" (w/ Rashad Eggleston & Brittany Haas) (Austin) – 4:07

Chart performance

Album

Personnel

Yonder Mountain String Band 

 Dave Johnston – banjo, vocals
 Jeff Austin – mandolin, vocals
 Ben Kaufmann – bass, vocals
 Adam Aijala – guitar, vocals

Other musicians 

 Darol Anger – fiddle

Technical 

 Brad Burleson – engineer
 Brian Langeliers – layout design
 Whitney Maxwell – photography
 Paul Rennix – photography
 Gordon Wilson – photography
 Robert "Dandy" Thompson – cover photograph
 Sandy Walczak – cover photograph
 James Tuttle – mixing
 Bryce Wisdom – artwork

References

External links 
 Yonder Mountain String Band Official Homepage
 Frog Pad Records Homepage

Yonder Mountain String Band albums
2004 live albums
Frog Pad Records live albums